Katherine Stevens (or variants) may refer to:

 Katie Stevens (born 1992), American singer
 Catherine Stevens (1803–1876), English writer
 Catherine Stephens (1794–1882), English singer and actress
 Kaye Stevens (born Catherine Louise Stephens, 1932–2011), American singer and actress
 K. T. Stevens (born Gloria Wood, 1919-), American actress